Ice sledge speed racing was contested at the Winter Paralympic Games from the second Winter Games in 1980, to the 1988 Winter Games, and then at the 1994 and 1998 Winter Games.

The events were held indoors for the first time at the 1994 Paralympics in Lillehammer.

Events

Medal table 
 NPCs in italics no longer compete at the Winter Paralympics

See also

 Speed skating at the Winter Olympics

References

 
Sports at the Winter Paralympics